Guhan Subramanian is an American lawyer and economist, focusing in corporate law and finance, dispute resolution and negotiations and dealmaking, currently the Joseph Flom Professor of Law and Business at Harvard Law School and Douglas Weaver Professor of Business Law at Harvard Business School.

References

Harvard Law School faculty
Harvard Business School faculty
American lawyers
21st-century American economists
Harvard University alumni
Living people
Year of birth missing (living people)